Calyce sumatrensis is a species of beetle in the Calyce genus. It was discovered in 1989.

References

Mordellidae
Beetles described in 1989